Roadrunner was a monthly Australian music magazine based in Adelaide, South Australia. The magazine was founded by Stuart Coupe and Donald Robertson and forty-eight issues were published between March 1978 and January 1983.

The magazine was inspired by the punk rock/new wave movement of the mid 1970s and took its name from the Jonathan Richman song Roadrunner. In its first year (1978) Roadrunner was produced by an editorial collective that included Coupe, Robertson, Allan Coop, Alex Ehlert, Bruce Milne and Clinton Walker and was only distributed in South Australia. Robertson became editor and publisher and secured national distribution from issue 10 (February 1979). Issue 23 (February 1980) of the magazine forms part of the Festival Records collection at Sydney's Powerhouse Museum as an example of how rock music magazines helped to promote overseas recording artists.

In the first edition of the Australian Music Directory (1981–82), Miranda Brown commented that Roadrunner offered its readers, ‘the vitality that established papers often lack.’ She went on to say: 'The paper has a strong nationalistic bent and though its coverage of the English scene is extensive, most of the copy is written by Australians abroad or here. Roadrunner articles tend to be rough-edged and experimental, with a minimum of editorial intervention. The approach is personal and highly committed and the magazine was the first to treat Australian music as a force with its own history, geography and ideologies, although the other major rock papers quickly followed suit.’

In Dig—Australian Rock and Pop Music 1960–85 David Nichols says: ‘Adelaide’s Roadrunner was without doubt a quality publication. Edited and published by Donald Robertson—the survivor from its founding co-operative—the paper attracted a number of important and interesting writers from around the country who recognised it as a valuable forum. Roadrunner, whose cover price was similar to the imported magazines such as NME and Melody Maker, exhibited considerable bravery. It had no qualms about running a five-page exploration of (Mushroom Records’) Michael Gudinski’s business interests. It also gave invaluable early coverage to new Aboriginal groups such as No Fixed Address, even before they made the classic film Wrong Side of the Road – indeed it put them on its cover. That all this was achieved from Australia's smallest mainland state capital is testament to the talent and dedication of Robertson and his writers.’

The magazine hit financial difficulties in mid-1982 and relocated to Sydney for a final issue, which was published in January 1983. The final issue saw a change to a full colour, glossy format that anticipated the emergence of Countdown Magazine (1982–87) and the Australian version of Smash Hits.

Notable contributors included: Keith Shadwick, Stuart Matchett, Ross Stapleton, Scott Matheson, Peter Nelson, Adrian Ryan, Keri Phillips, Craig N. Pearce, Larry Buttrose, Chris Willis, Toby Creswell, Mark Mordue, Richard McGregor, Richard Guilliat, David Langsam, Jillian Burt, Dennis Atkins and Elly McDonald.

In May 2017, the University of Wollongong in New South Wales made all 48 issues of Roadrunner available in a digital archive. To accompany this release, publisher Donald Robertson published a brief history of the magazine.

In October 2019, Roadrunnertwice published The Big Beat: rock music in Australia 1978-1983, through the pages of Roadrunner magazine, a 544 page anthology of the magazine in a limited hardcover edition of 500 copies.

References

External links 
 https://www.roadrunnertwice.com.au
 https://archivesonline.uow.edu.au/nodes/view/3493

1983 disestablishments in Australia
Defunct magazines published in Australia
Magazines established in 1978
1978 establishments in Australia
Music magazines published in Australia
English-language magazines
Magazines disestablished in 1983
Monthly magazines published in Australia
Mass media in Adelaide
Music in Adelaide